Paracanoe classification is the classification system for paracanoe. It consists of three categories KL1, KL2 and KL3. Paracanoe will be included for the first time at the 2016 Rio Paralympics. The sport is governed by the International Canoe Federation.

History
The paracanoe classification system was created by the International Paralympic Committee (IPC). In 2003, the IPC Athletics Classification Project developed an evidence-based classification system to assist with eligibility and sports class allocation. In April 2015, the International Canoe Federation released a new classification system ahead of the 2016 Rio Paralympics. Changes were made to rename different classes of para-canoeing. Current categories are included below. 
Para-canoeing will be included for the first time at the Summer Paralympics in Rio 2016 as voted in by the IPC in 2010.

ICF classification
The ICF classifies paddlers into three classes according to their impairments.

KL1
KL1-class competitors have limited or no trunk function and no leg balance. They apply force predominantly using the arms and/or shoulders.

Eligible paddlers meet one of the following:
 Impaired range of motion
 Loss of muscle strength equivalent to spinal cord injury complete at T12 level.

KL2
KL2-class competitors have partial leg and trunk function alongside good arm strength. They may require a backrest and footboard to propel the canoe depending on their leg function.

Eligible paddlers meet one of the following:
 Limb loss of deficiency equivalent to double above leg amputation
 Significant muscle strength loss in both legs 
 Impaired range of motion within lower limbs and trunk

KL3
KL3-class competitors have trunk function and partial leg function. They sit in a forward flexed position and use a footboard or the seat to help propel the boat.

Eligible paddlers meet one of the following:
 Limb loss deficiency equivalent to tarsal metatarsal amputation of foot
 Loss of muscle strength equivalent to incomplete spinal cord injury at S1
 Impaired range of motion: In lower limbs

Non-Paralympic Paracanoe events
Paracanoe athletes have an opportunity to compete at an international level. The classification system is the same but uses different names for categories: VL1, VL2 an VL3.

At the Paralympic Games 
For the 2016 Summer Paralympics in Rio, the International Paralympic Committee had a zero classification at the Games policy.  This policy was put into place in 2014, with the goal of avoiding last minute changes in classes that would negatively impact athlete training preparations. All competitors needed to be internationally classified with their classification status confirmed prior to the Games, with exceptions to this policy being dealt with on a case-by-case basis. In case there was a need for classification or reclassification at the Games despite best efforts otherwise, paracanoe classification was scheduled for September 10 and September 11 at Lagoa Stadium.  For sportspeople with physical or intellectual disabilities going through  classification or reclassification in Rio, their in competition observation event is their first appearance in competition at the Games.[33]

References

Parasports classifications
Paracanoe